Lespezi (2,516 m) is the fifth highest mountain peak in Romania. The mountain is located in Sibiu County in the Făgăraș Mountains.

References 

Mountains of Romania
Mountains of the Southern Carpathians
Geography of Sibiu County